Danau is the Indonesian and Malay word for lake and can be found in topography.  Danaw/Danao is the corresponding word in Cebuano, most notably in the word Mindanao.

As lake names 
Lake Maninjau
Lake Dibawah

Other uses 
 Kampong Danau, a village in Brunei
 Danau language, a Mon-Khmer language in Myanmar (Burma)

See also
 Danao (disambiguation)
 Danou (disambiguation)

Indonesian words and phrases
Cebuano language